Mir EO-7 was the seventh long duration expedition to the space station Mir. The two crew members were Gennadi Manakov (Commander) and Gennadi Strekalov (Flight Engineer).

Crew

The backup crew for this expedition were Viktor Afanasyev (Commander) and Musa Manarov (Flight Engineer).

Overview

Crew Arrival
The two crew members arrived at Mir via Soyuz TM-10, which launched on 3 August 1990. The Soyuz spacecraft docked on to the Kvant2 Complex.

Mission Highlights
While on board, the crew conducted an extensive programme of geophysical and astrophysical research, experiments on biology and biotechnology and work on space materials science. They also performed extensive maintenance and repair work on the damaged hatch of the Kvant-2-module. This repair was only partially successful.

Expedition Conclusion
The crew left on Soyuz TM-10 on 7 December 1990. The expedition in total lasted 130 days, 20 hours and 35 minutes. The crew completed 2070 orbits of the Earth.

See also

 1990 in spaceflight

References

External links 
 Space Facts

Mir
1990 in the Soviet Union